Orfana railway station is a railway station in Orfana, Karditsa, Thessaly, Greece.
It is located just east of the village. Opened in 1995, replacing an older station of the same name.

History 
On 16 January 1972, at around 1645 hours on the line between Orfana and Doxara, a breakdown in communication between the corresponding stationmasters at Doxaras and Orfana caused an express train and a military relief train to collide in bad weather on the single track line. The southbound diesel hauled Acropolis Express and northbound Number 121 Athens-Thessaloniki, (known as posta) were allowed to proceed without first allowing a passing loop. 21 people died, and more than 40 were injured in one of the deadliest rail accidents in Greece. Nikolaos Gekas The stationmaster at Orfana was later sentenced to 5 years for his part in the disaster.

Services
The station is served by only eight trains a day.

Station layout

References

Railway stations in Thessaly
Railway stations opened in 1995